Danica Karađorđević (born 18 August 1986), known in English as Princess Danica Karageorgevitch and titled Danica, Hereditary Princess of Serbia and Yugoslavia, is a Serbian–French graphic designer and wife of Hereditary Prince Philip, heir to Crown Prince Alexander. She is a member of the Serbian royal House of Karađorđević.

Early life and education
Princess Danica was born in Belgrade, SR Serbia, SFR Yugoslavia (now Serbia) on 18 August 1986 as Danica Marinković. She is the daughter of Milan "Cile" Marinković (b. 1947 in Belgrade), an impressionist painter, and his wife, Zorica "Beba" Krupež. Since 1992, she has lived in Paris, France, and has completed her education there, as well as obtained the French citizenship. She graduated in graphic design and visual communications at the Academy of Applied Arts in Paris, as well as at the comparative literature and slavistics studies at Sorbonne University in Paris. In London, U.K., the Princess got her her master's degree in graphic design and communication at the Chelsea College of Arts, University of the Arts London.

Personal life

Design career 
Well known under the artistic name Dana Maar (stylized as Dana MAAR), besides the basic profession of graphic design, she creatively expresses herself as a collagist. Her already recognizable style is manifested through the collages she creates and actively exhibits through solo and group exhibitions and art fairs, thus becoming part of the cultural milieu of both Belgrade and Paris. Among numerous solo exhibitions in Belgrade, Princess Danica had solo exhibitions in Parisians galleries: Galerie Origines and Galleries Artessepia within the Carré Rive Gauche event, Saint-Germain des Près, in 2007 and 2008. Her works have also been exhibited in the Biennale of Contemporary Art in Paris in 2008, 2010 and 2014. She has been a member of the Applied Artists and Designers Association of Serbia in the design section since 2010.

Marriage and issue 
On 24 July 2017, her engagement to Prince Philip of Serbia was announced. They married on 7 October 2017, at the Cathedral Church of Saint Michael the Archangel in Belgrade, Serbia. Their witnesses were Victoria, Crown Princess of Sweden and Philip's older brother Prince Peter. Several members of European royal families also attended, including Queen Sofía of Spain, Princess Anne, Duchess of Calabria, Prince Guillaume of Luxembourg with his wife Sibilla, Prince Amyn Aga Khan, Princess Jeet Nabha Khemka, as well as numerous relatives and guests of the Karađorđević Royal Family and the Marinković family, including president of the National Assembly of Serbia Maja Gojković among others. It was the first royal wedding in Serbia since 1922 and the wedding of King Alexander I and Princess Maria of Romania, the paternal grand-grandparents of her husband. Her wedding gown was created by Serbian fashion designer Roksanda Ilinčić.

Princess Danica gave birth to their son, Prince Stephen, in Belgrade on 25 February 2018, at 10:30 am. Prince Stephen is the first male child born to the royal family on Serbian soil for 90 years, the last such birth being that of Prince Tomislav in Belgrade in 1928. The Prince was baptized on December 15, 2018, at the Royal Palace's Chapel in Belgrade.

Public life

Princess in Serbia (2020–2022) 
Princess Danica and her family lived in London after 2017, but as of July 2020 they relocated and currently live in her hometown, Belgrade.

On 22 November 2020, Princess Danica and Prince Philip were the only members of the House of Karađorđević who attended the funeral service of Serbian Patriarch Irinej at the Church of Saint Sava. Princess Danica and Prince Filip were also the only members of the House of Karađorđević who attended enthronement of newly elected Patriarch Porfirije on 19 February 2021 in St. Michael's Cathedral in Belgrade.

On 13 September 2021, Danica and her husband attended Holy Liturgy led by Patriarch Porfirije in the Jasenovac Monastery in Croatia and visited the Jasenovac concentration camp and Stone Flower sculpture becoming first members of the House of Karađorđević who visited this memorial site from World War II.

On 9 January 2022, Danica and her husband attended the national day celebration of the Republika Srpska, one of the two entities of Bosnia and Herzegovina, in Banja Luka.

Hereditary Princess (2022–present) 
On 27 April 2022, Princess Danica witnessed when her brother-in-law Prince Peter renounced his title of Hereditary Prince of Serbia and Yugoslavia – for himself and his descendants – in favor of her husband Philip, making her the Hereditary Princess. The ceremony took place in Seville at Casa de Pilatos in the presence of Peter's and Philip's mother Princess Maria Da Gloria of Orléans-Braganza and Duchess of Segorbe, and others.

Arms

See also 
 List of princesses of Serbia
 Serbs in France

References

External links 
 
 Dana MAAR at Saatchi Art
  at the Royal Family of Serbia Official Website

1986 births
Living people
Serbian princesses
Alumni of Chelsea College of Arts
Karađorđević dynasty
Eastern Orthodox Christians from Serbia
Eastern Orthodox Christians from France
French graphic designers
French people of Serbian descent
Naturalized citizens of France
Paris-Sorbonne University alumni
People from Belgrade
Princesses by marriage
Serbian graphic designers
Serbian emigrants to France
Serbian expatriates in the United Kingdom
Women graphic designers